Procès-verbal (French procès, process, Late Latin verbalis, from verbum, word) is a legal term with a number of meanings:

In law
in Francophone countries, such as France, the term "procès-verbal" is frequently mentioned as "P.V." (pronounced "pay vay"), and most commonly means a ticket or a fine issued by a Police or other law enforcement officer. Despite the use of "verbal" in the term, a P.V. is often a paper ticket or citation.
in French, Belgian and Dutch law (proces-verbal, proces verbaal), a detailed authenticated account drawn up by a magistrate, police officer, or other person having authority of acts or proceedings done in the exercise of his duty.
in a criminal charge, a procès-verbal is a statement of the facts of the case
the written minutes of a meeting or assembly
In Canada, un procès verbal d'infraction is the French Canadian translation of a misdemeanor police citation, or ticket

In international law and diplomacy
in international law and diplomacy, a procès-verbal is the process of adopting corrections to the text of a treaty, by mutual agreement of the parties. As such it is a process of amendment, but is reserved for minor and non-controversial technical corrections that do not change the substance of the treaty.

See also
 Travaux préparatoires

References

French legal terminology
Treaty law